Kees Akerboom Sr. (born 18 April 1952) is a retired Dutch basketball player. Akerboom is the father of Kees Akerboom Jr., who also played as a professional basketball player in the Eredivisie. He was a 2.04 m tall shooting guard.

Club career
Akerboom started playing basketball at age 16 and joined the Flamingo's Haarlem under Jan Janbroers after two years.

Akerboom played with EBBC Den Bosch, with whom he reached a FIBA Saporta Cup Final in 1979.

Dutch national team
As a member of the senior Dutch national basketball team, Akerboom led the 1977 EuroBasket in scoring, averaging 27 points per game. His performance earned him a selection to the EuroBasket All-Tournament Team. Akerboom is 2nd on the all-time list of games played for the senior Dutch national team, with 182 appearances. Only Toon van Helfteren, has played more games, with 207.

Awards and accomplishments

Club
Flamingo's Haarlem
3× Eredivisie: (1971, 1972, 1973)
2× NBB Cup: (1970, 1971)
Den Bosch
5× Eredivisie: (1979, 1980, 1981, 1984, 1985)

Individual
3× Dutch League MVP: (1980, 1981, 1985)
7× All-Dutch League Team: (1974, 1975, 1978, 1980, 1981, 1982, 1984, 1985)
5× Dutch League All-Star: (1975, 1976, 1978, 1981, 1982)
FIBA EuroBasket Top Scorer: (1977)
FIBA EuroBasket All-Tournament Team: (1977)

References

External links
FIBA.com profile

1952 births
Living people
Dutch Basketball League players
Dutch men's basketball players
Heroes Den Bosch players
Sportspeople from Haarlem
Small forwards
Shooting guards